Hend Khaleh Rural District is a rural district (dehestan) in Tulem District, Sowme'eh Sara County, Gilan Province, Iran. At the 2006 census, its population was 13,109, in 3,655 families. The rural district has 14 villages.

References 

Rural Districts of Gilan Province
Sowme'eh Sara County